This article is a comparison of notable issue tracking systems used primarily for help desks and service desks rather than for bug tracking or project management.

See also 
 Comparison of issue-tracking systems
 Networked Help Desk
 OSS through Java

External links 
 

Help desk issue tracking software